Yorkshire Building Society is the third largest building society in the UK, with its headquarters in Bradford, West Yorkshire, England. It is a member of the Building Societies Association.

The society also owns the Chelsea Building Society and Norwich and Peterborough Building Society, as well as Accord Mortgages and the savings business of Egg, which are referred to as the Yorkshire Building Society Group. Collectively the group employs 3,300 staff throughout the UK and services 3 million members.

The society currently provides financial services both directly and through a 132-strong branch network and 99 associated agencies across the UK. Despite changes in the industry in recent years, Yorkshire Building Society remains one of the major mutual building societies in Britain - a review in 1995 confirmed that their mutual status was important to them, so that they remain answerable to their members, rather than outside shareholders.

History

In 1864, the Huddersfield Equitable Permanent Benefit Building Society was founded in Huddersfield, and expansion through a series of agreed mergers, predominantly with the Bradford Permanent Building Society in 1975, has seen it evolve into the national building society that it is today. The current name came into use in 1982, following the merger of the Huddersfield & Bradford Building Society and the West Yorkshire Building Society. Yorkshire Building Society also has a mortgage subsidiary company, Accord. In August 2011 it announced that it was closing its offshore subsidiary, Yorkshire Guernsey.

High Point on Westgate in Bradford was built as the headquarters of Yorkshire Building Society in the 1970s.

The Yorkshire took over the Sussex-based Haywards Heath Building Society in 1992, in an effort to develop a southern based branch presence. In 2001, the Society merged with the Gainsborough Building Society.

In 2008, the Yorkshire merged with the Barnsley Building Society which had become a victim of the Icelandic banking crisis. After learning lessons from previous mergers, and with the Barnsley being a larger organisation with a well-established brand, the Yorkshire initially decided to keep the Barnsley brand in order to keep existing customers and use it as another route to market their products.

In 2009, the Yorkshire noted that they were in advanced merger talks with Chelsea Building Society. The following day it was announced that they were to merge. The merger with Chelsea Building Society, which retained its own branding until 2016, was completed in 2010. Chelsea branded products and services are now available online and by telephone only.

The ninth largest building society at the time, Norwich and Peterborough, entered into merger discussions with the Society on 19 March 2011. Following due diligence by the Yorkshire board, N&P members voted in favour of the proposal on 22 August. FSA approval followed on 23 September and the transfer of engagements was completed on 1 November. With almost no geographical overlap, the N&P name was retained as a separate and distinct brand.

On 25 July 2011, the Yorkshire announced it was buying the Egg savings and mortgage business from Citi in a deal worth £2.5 billion. Use of the Egg trade marks by Yorkshire Building Society is currently under licence from Egg Banking Plc which provides any residual Egg savings products that were not transferred to the Yorkshire and any Egg loans products that were not sold to Britannica Recoveries S.a.r.l.

Brass band

In 1993, the former Hammonds Sauce Works Band was renamed as the Yorkshire Building Society Band. The building society supported the main band and also the YBS Hawley Band and YBS Juniors.  The building society ceased its sponsorship in December 2004 although the YBS initials were retained in the band's name until 2008. From January 2009, the band was renamed the Hammonds Saltaire Band.

See also

List of banks
List of banks in United Kingdom

References

External links

 

Building societies of England
Banks established in 1864
Organizations established in 1864
Companies based in Bradford
1864 establishments in England